Oscar Schwab (June 24, 1882 – August 24, 1955) was an American cyclist. He competed in the men's quarter mile event at the 1904 Summer Olympics.

References

External links
 

1882 births
1955 deaths
American male cyclists
Olympic cyclists of the United States
Cyclists at the 1904 Summer Olympics
Cyclists from Paris